Vaughn Leonard Flora (January 17, 1945 – March 17, 2022) was an American politician who served in the Kansas House of Representatives for 14 years.

Flora was born in Quinter, Kansas, where he attended local public schools. He attended Kansas State University, where he met his first wife, Rose Owen. He was involved with the real estate business, farmers union, and agricultural movement. 

Flora served in the Kansas House of Representatives from 1995 to 2008 as a Democrat. He declined to run for re-election in 2008, and was succeeded by fellow Democrat Sean Gatewood.

References

1945 births
2022 deaths
People from Quinter, Kansas
Businesspeople from Kansas
Democratic Party members of the Kansas House of Representatives
20th-century American politicians
21st-century American politicians